Sir Richard Clive Butler (12 January 1929 – 28 January 2012) was a British farmer and merchant banker, President of the National Farmers' Union of England and Wales.

Early life
One of the sons of the Conservative politician Rab Butler, by his marriage to Sydney Elizabeth Courtauld, daughter and co-heiress of Samuel Courtauld, the young Butler was educated at Eton College and Pembroke College, Cambridge, and was commissioned as a second lieutenant into the Royal Horse Guards. 

The Courtaulds owned estates in north Essex, and on completing his National service Butler concerned himself with estate management.

Career
Butler became a farmer in 1953 and inherited a 1500-acre arable estate in Essex on the death of his mother in 1954. He was an active member of the National Farmers' Union of England and Wales, joining its Council in 1962. In 1970, he became vice-president, and in 1971 deputy president to Henry Plumb, continuing almost until the end of the 1970s. He was then President from 1979 to 1986. 

He was knighted by H. M. the Queen at Buckingham Palace on 10 November 1981.

After retiring from the NFU, for a year Butler was president of COPA, the union of European farmers, and also took on business directorships. In the City of London, he became a director of County Natwest Investment Management and served as Chairman from 1989 to 1996.<ref name=WW>"Butler, Hon. Sir Richard (Clive)", in Who Was Who 2011–2015 (2016, } </ref>

Butler listed his recreations in Who's Who'' as “hunting, shooting, DIY” and was chairman of the East Essex Hunt for forty years.

Personal life
On 5 July 1952, Butler married Susan Anne Maud Walker, a daughter of Patrick Bruce Walker and Sybil Middleton Turner. They had a daughter, Antonia Mary (1954) and twin sons, Richard Michael and Christopher Patrick (1956).

Honours
High Sheriff of Essex, 1969
Deputy Lieutenant of Essex, 1972
Knight Bachelor, 1981

Notes

1929 births
2012 deaths
Deputy Lieutenants of Essex
High Sheriffs of Essex
People educated at Eton College
Royal Horse Guards officers